Phnum Proek may refer to:
Phnum Proek District
Phnum Proek (commune)